Nikita Semjonov (22 October 1887 Irboska Parish, Pskov Governorate – ?) was an Estonian politician. He was a member of III Riigikogu. As of 1 October 1928, he was counted as missing from Riigikogu, and therefore he was replaced by Jakob Homin.

References

1887 births
Members of the Riigikogu, 1926–1929
Year of death missing